In mathematics and political science, the quota rule describes a desired property of a proportional apportionment or election method. It states that the number of seats that should be allocated to a given party should be between the upper or lower roundings (called upper and lower quotas) of its fractional proportional share (called natural quota). As an example, if a party deserves 10.56 seats out of 15, the quota rule states that when the seats are allotted, the party may get 10 or 11 seats, but not lower or higher. Many common election methods, such as all highest averages methods, violate the quota rule.

Mathematics

The lower quota is then the natural quota rounded down to the nearest integer while the upper quota is the natural quota rounded up. The quota rule states that the only two allocations that a party can receive should be either the lower or upper quota. If at any time an allocation gives a party a greater or lesser number of seats than the upper or lower quota, that allocation (and by extension, the method used to allocate it) is said to be in violation of the quota rule. Another way to state this is to say that a given method only satisfies the quota rule if each party's allocation differs from its natural quota by less than one, where each party's allocation is an integer value.

Example
The lower quota for party A is 1, because 1.8 rounded down equal 1. The upper quota, 1.8 rounded up, is 2. Therefore, the quota rule states that the only two allocations allowed for party A are 1 or 2 seats on the council. If there is a second party, B, that has 137 members, then the quota rule states that party B gets , rounded up and down equals either 2 or 3 seats. In all cases, the method for actually allocating the seats determines whether an allocation violates the quota rule, which in this case would mean giving party A any seats other than 1 or 2, giving party B any other than 2 or 3, or giving party C any other than 0 or 1 seat.

Relation to apportionment paradoxes
The Balinski–Young theorem proved in 1980 that if an apportionment method satisfies the quota rule, it must fail to satisfy some apportionment paradox. For instance, although Largest remainder method satisfies the quota rule, it violates the Alabama paradox and the population paradox. The theorem itself is broken up into several different proofs that cover a wide number of circumstances.

Specifically, there are two main statements that apply to the quota rule:
Any method that follows the quota rule must fail the population paradox.
Any method that is free of both the Alabama paradox and the population paradox must necessarily fail the quota rule for some circumstances.

Use in apportionment methods
Different methods for allocating seats may or may not satisfy the quota rule. While many methods do violate the quota rule, it is sometimes preferable to violate the rule very rarely than to violate some other apportionment paradox; some sophisticated methods violate the rule so rarely that it has not ever happened in a real apportionment, while some methods that never violate the quota rule violate other paradoxes in much more serious fashions.

The Largest remainder method does satisfy the quota rule. The method works by proportioning seats equally until a fractional value is reached; the surplus seats are then given to the party with the largest fractional parts until there are no more surplus seats. Because it is impossible to give more than one surplus seat to a party, every party will always get either its lower or upper quota. 

The D'Hondt method, also known as the Jefferson method sometimes violates the quota rule by allocating more seats than the upper quota allowed. Since D'Hondt was the first method used for Congressional apportionment in the United States, this violation led to a growing problem where larger states receive more representatives than smaller states, which was not corrected until the Webster/Sainte-Laguë method was implemented in 1842; even though Webster/Sainte-Laguë does violate the quota rule, it happens extremely rarely.

References

Apportionment (politics)
Electoral system criteria